Political Animal is a performance and radio show created by British comedians John Oliver and Andy Zaltzman in which various stand-up comedians perform political material.

Political Animal began at the 2004 Edinburgh Festival Fringe and has returned every year since, it was initially co-hosted by Zaltzman and Oliver but since 2006 hosted by Zaltzman alone except for some of the 2011 fringe where Oliver returned. In 2007 Political Animal also became a radio series on BBC Radio 4. It returned for a second series in 2008, running for 10 episodes. The series took the form of a stand-up show, with Zaltzman and Oliver performing in between the acts they introduced.

Previous guests have included Frankie Boyle, Daniel Kitson, Stewart Lee, Richard Herring, Jeremy Hardy, Marcus Brigstocke, Robert Newman, Chris Addison, Russell Howard and Russell Brand.

Controversy
In 2010, BBC apologised for Frankie Boyle's joke in which the comedian compared Palestine to a cake being 'punched to pieces by a very angry Jew'.

References

External links

Political Animal 2008's description at chortle.co.uk

BBC Radio comedy programmes